The People vs. Paul Crump is a 1962 documentary about the prisoner Paul Crump who was on death row for robbery and murder.

The film was made for Chicago television and was highly praised and crucial to the career of its director William Friedkin, helping him get an agent and jobs making documentaries for David Wolper, and then an episode of The Alfred Hitchcock Hour. The film won the Golden Gate Award Winner for Film as Communication at the 1962 San Francisco International Film Festival.

A digitally restored version of the film was released by Facets in May 2014.

See also
 List of American films of 1962

References

Friedkin, William, The Friedkin Connection, Harper Collins 2013

External links

The People vs. Paul Crump at New York Times

Documentary films about incarceration in the United States
Films directed by William Friedkin
1962 documentary films
1962 films
American documentary films
American documentary television films
1962 television films
1960s American films